The Roman Catholic Diocese of Itabuna is a Latin suffragan diocese in the Ecclesiastical province of São Salvador da Bahia in Bahia state, eastern Brazil.

Its cathedral episcopal see is Catedral São José, dedicated to Saint Joseph, in the city of Itabuna.

Statistics 
As per 2914, it pastorally served 608,000 Catholics (84.8% of 717,000 total) on 14,533 km² in 33 parishes and 85 missions with 42 priests (27 diocesan, 15 religious), 4 deacons, 48 lay religious (22 brothers, 26 sisters) and 5 seminarians.

History 
 Established on 7 November 1978 as Diocese of Itabuna, on territory split off from the Diocese of Ilhéus.
 Lost territory on 1996.06.12 to establish the Diocese of Eunápolis.

Episcopal ordinaries
(all Roman rite)

Suffragan Bishops of Itabuna 
 Homero Leite Meira (7 November 1978 – 24 September 1980), next Bishop of Irecê (Brazil) (24 September 1980 – retired 13 June 1983), died 2014
 Eliseu Maria Gomes de Oliveira, Carmelite Order (O.Carm.) (24 September 1980 – 20 July 1983); previously Titular Bishop of Tituli in Numidia (3 February 1968 – 5 February 1974) as Auxiliary Bishop of Maceió (Brazil) (3 February 1968 – 5 February 1974), then Bishop of Caetité (Brazil) (5 February 1974 – retired 24 September 1980); died 2002
 Paulo Lopes de Faria (later Archbishop) (16 December 1983 – 2 August 1995); previously Titular Bishop of Thelepte (7 November 1980 – 16 December 1983) as Auxiliary Bishop of Niterói (Brazil) (7 November 1980 – 16 December 1983); later Coadjutor Archbishop of Diamantina (Brazil) (2 August 1995 – 14 May 1997), succeeding as Metropolitan Archbishop of Diamantina (14 May 1997 – retired 30 May 2007); died 2009
 Czesław Stanula, Redemptorists (C.Ss.R.) (born Poland) (27 August 1997 – retired 1 February 2017); previously Bishop of Floresta (Brazil) (17 June 1989 – 27 August 1997); died 2020
 Carlos Alberto dos Santos (1 February 2017 – ...), previously Bishop of Teixeira de Freitas–Caravelas (Brazil) (15 June 2005 – 1 February 2017).

References

Sources and external links 

 GCatholic.org, with oggle map and – satellite photo – data for all sections
 Catholic Hierarchy

Roman Catholic dioceses in Brazil
Christian organizations established in 1978
Roman Catholic Ecclesiastical Province of São Salvador da Bahia
Roman Catholic dioceses and prelatures established in the 20th century